La Montañita is a town and municipality in Caquetá Department, Colombia.

References

Municipalities of Caquetá Department